Paralympic powerlifting at the 2017 ASEAN Para Games was held at Malaysian International Trade & Exhibition Centre (MITEC)
, Kuala Lumpur.

Medal tally

Medalists

Men

Women

See also
Weightlifting at the 2017 Southeast Asian Games

External links
 Powerlifting Games Result System

2017 ASEAN Para Games
Powerlifting at the ASEAN Para Games